François Audouy (born June 17, 1974) is a French-American movie production designer. He is a frequent collaborator with director James Mangold, having designed The Wolverine (2013) its sequel Logan (2016), and Ford v Ferrari (2019) which was nominated for several Academy Awards including Best Picture. Other design credits include the fantasy films Abraham Lincoln: Vampire Hunter (2012) Dracula Untold (2014) and Ghostbusters: Afterlife (2021).

In addition to his film career, Audouy has designed award-winning commercials and music videos; including commercials for Apple, Bud-Lite, Lexus, Old Spice, and Samsung; and music videos for Ed Sheeran, Coldplay, Billie Eilish, P!nk, Harry Styles, Camila Cabello and Dua Lipa.

Early life
Audouy was born in Toulouse, France, to a French father and an English mother. He is a bi-lingual speaker of French and English.

He moved to Southern California at the age of six after his parents divorced and his mother remarried.

Filmography

As production designer

As art director

Awards 
2023: Nominated for an Art Directors Guild production design award for the Just Eat commercial “Did Somebody Say" and also the Bud Lite Seltzer commercial “Land of Loud Flavors.” Also nominated for the music video “Let Somebody Go” by Coldplay and Selena Gomez. 
2022: Won an ADG award for the Apple Music commercial for "Happier Than Ever." Nominated for another five ADG awards for the film Ghostbusters: Afterlife, the music videos for Ed Sheeran "Shivers," P!nk "All I Know So Far," Coldplay + BTS "My Universe," and the commercial for Neom "Made to Change." Also won an SDSA award, with Set Decorator Jill Crawford, for Apple Music's "Happier Than Ever."
2021: Won an ADG award for Harry Styles' "Falling" music video (the first ADG award ever awarded to a music video), and nominated for Camila Cabello's "My Oh My" music video in the same Short Format category. Also nominated for a SDSA award for Harry Styles’ “Falling.”
2020: Nominated for an ADG award in the Period Film category, and Satellite Award for Best Art Direction & Production Design for Ford v. Ferrari.
2018: Won an ADG award in the Contemporary Film category for Logan.
2006: Nominated for an Art Directors Guild production design award in the Period or Fantasy Film category for his work as one of the Art Directors on Charlie and the Chocolate Factory.

References

External links
 François Audouy Official Site

1974 births
French emigrants to the United States
American production designers
Living people
Mass media people from Toulouse
French production designers